The 1907 Yukon general election was held on 16 April 1907 to elect five of the ten members of the Yukon Territorial Council.

Members elected

References

Elections in Yukon
1907 elections in Canada
1907 in Yukon
April 1907 events